This is a list of notable parishes and missions both within the Anglican Communion and in the Anglican Continuum that self-identify as Anglo-Catholic.

Australia

Brazil

Canada

Japan

New Zealand

Philippines

United Kingdom

United States
(ordered by state then city)

Puerto Rico
Episcopal Cathedral of St. John the Baptist in San Juan
Iglesia de la Santísima Trinidad, in Ponce

South Africa

See also

List of Anglican churches

References

 

Anglo-Catholic Churches
Episcopal church buildings in the United States